Denislav Stanchev (born 28 March 2000) is a Bulgarian footballer who plays as a midfielder for Beroe.

Career
On 17 February 2017, Stanchev made his professional debut for his hometown club Beroe Stara Zagora in a 4–0 away win against Dunav Ruse, coming on as substitute for Anton Karachanakov.

References

External links

Living people
2000 births
Sportspeople from Stara Zagora
Bulgarian footballers
Bulgaria youth international footballers
Bulgarian expatriate footballers
Association football midfielders
First Professional Football League (Bulgaria) players
II liga players
PFC Beroe Stara Zagora players
FC Vereya players
Bytovia Bytów players
FC Lokomotiv 1929 Sofia players
Bulgarian expatriate sportspeople in Poland
Expatriate footballers in Poland